The Most of Herman's Hermits Volume 2 is a greatest hits album (although it contained only three UK singles) released in the U.K. by EMI Records' budget label Music For Pleasure for Herman's Hermits in 1972.

Track listing
 "A Must to Avoid" (Phil Sloan, Steve Barri) - 1:59
 "Silhouettes" (Bob Crewe, Frank Slay, Jr.) - 1:59
 "Saturday's Child" (David Gates) - 2:38
 "If You're Thinking What I'm Thinking" (Tommy Boyce, Bobby Hart) - 2:24
 "Jezebel" (Wayne Shanklin, Charles Aznavour) - 3:23
 "Little Miss Sorrow, Child of Tomorrow" (Bruce Woodley) - 2:34
 "My Sentimental Friend" (Geoff Stephens, John Carter) - 3:16
 "Lemon and Lime" (Graham Gouldman)
 "Smile Please" (Albert King, Mickie Most, Peter Noone) - 2:41
 "It's Nice to Be Out in the Morning" (Graham Gouldman)
 "Gaslite Street" (Derek Leckenby, Keith Hopwood) - 2:34
 "Rattler" (Bruce Woodley) - 3:13

1972 greatest hits albums
Herman's Hermits albums
Albums produced by Mickie Most